Durmish (Dormish) Khan Shamlu was a Qizilbash officer of Turkoman origin, who occupied high offices under the Safavid king (shah) Ismail I (r. 1501–1524) and the latter's son Tahmasp I (r. 1524 – 1576). Durmish Khan later died in 1525.

Biography 
Durmish Khan was the son of Abdi Beg Shamlu, while his mother was a sister of shah Ismail I. Furthermore, Durmish Khan had a brother named Husayn Khan Shamlu. In 1503, Durmish Khan was appointed as the governor of Isfahan, but chose to stay in the Safavid capital of Tabriz and appointed Mirza Shah Husayn as his vizier.

In 1514, while the Safavid forces were at Chaldiran and planning on how to confront the Ottomans, who had declared war against the Safavid Empire. Mohammad Khan Ustajlu, who served as the governor of Diyarbakır, and Nur-Ali Khalifa, a commander who knew how the Ottomans fought, proposed that they should attack as quickly as possible. However, this proposal was rejected by Durmish Khan, who rudely said that Muhammad Khan Ustajlu was only interested in the province which he governed. The proposal was also rejected by Ismail himself, who said; "I am not a caravan-thief, whatever is decreed by God, will occur." A battle shortly ensured, which, however, resulted in an absolute disaster for the Safavids, who lost most of their troops and commanders.

In 1518/9, Durmish Khan suppressed several rebellions in Mazandaran, and later in 1520 he was sent to Baghdad to defend the city against the Ottoman sultan Selim I, who, however, died of sickness before he managed to reach the city. In 1521, Mirza Shah Husayn, who now served as Ismail's vizier and had become so powerful that he chose to send Durmish Khan far away from the Safavid court—to Herat in Khorasan, where he was forced to serve as its governor. When Durmish Khan arrived to the city, he appointed Ahmad Sultan Afshar as the governor of several districts of the province. In May 1522, the Mughal ruler Babur seized Qandahar from Durmish Khan. In 1523/4, Herat was attacked a by a group of Uzbeks, which Durmish Khan managed to repel.

Durmish Khan later died in 1525 and was succeeded by his brother Husayn Khan Shamlu.

References

Sources 

 
 
 
 
 
 
 

Safavid generals
1525 deaths
15th-century births
Iranian Turkmen people
Shamlu
Safavid governors of Herat
Governors of Isfahan
Safavid governors
Safavid military officers
16th-century people of Safavid Iran
Safavid governors of Azerbaijan